Belfast Festival may refer to:
Belfast Festival at Queen's, an arts festival at Queen's University, Belfast
Belfast Film Festival, a film festival in Belfast
CineMagic (film festival), a children's film festival based in Belfast and Dublin